The Buluan River is a black river in Province of Maguindanao and Sultan Kudarat in the island of Mindanao in the Philippines. Located in Buluan joint by the Liguasan Marsh stream of the Rio Grande de Mindanao.

Rivers of the Philippines